Intense Tropical Cyclone Kenneth was the strongest tropical cyclone to make landfall in Mozambique since modern records began. The cyclone also caused significant damage in the Comoro Islands and Tanzania. The fourteenth tropical storm, record-breaking tenth tropical cyclone, and ninth intense tropical cyclone of the 2018–19 South-West Indian Ocean cyclone season, Kenneth formed from a vortex that the Météo-France office on La Réunion (MFR) first mentioned on 17 April. The MFR monitored the system over the next several days, before designating it as Tropical Disturbance 14 on 21 April. The disturbance was located in a favorable environment to the north of Madagascar, which allowed it to strengthen into a tropical depression and later a tropical storm, both on the next day. At that time, Kenneth began to undergo an eyewall replacement cycle and weakened slightly, before making landfall later that day as an intense tropical cyclone. As a result of land interaction, Kenneth became disorganised as it made landfall and rapidly degenerated thereafter. The storm then shifted southward, with the MFR cancelling all major warnings for inland cities. Kenneth was reclassified as an overland depression after landfall, with the MFR issuing its warning at midnight UTC on 26 April. Thunderstorm activity developed off the coast of Mozambique on 27 April as the system began drifting northward. Kenneth re-emerged off the coast of northern Mozambique on 28 April, before dissipating on the next day.

In the country of Comoros; Kenneth's wind and rainfall caused at least seven deaths. Damage was estimated at US$345 million. Prior to Kenneth's landfall, local authorities evacuated over 30,000 people in the path of the storm in northern Mozambique. Kenneth killed 45 people in Mozambique.

Meteorological history

On 17 April, the MFR began monitoring a vortex to the north of Madagascar. The MFR continued to monitor the system over the next several days, noting a significant increase in deep convection on 21 April. On 22 April at 12:00 UTC, the MFR began issuing advisories on the system, designating it as Tropical Disturbance 14. Early on 23 April, the JTWC began issuing warnings on the system, classifying it as Tropical Cyclone 24S. A few hours later, the MFR upgraded the system to a tropical depression while it was moving west, under the influence of a low-to-mid-level ridge located to the south. The MFR upgraded the depression to a moderate tropical storm at 12:00 UTC, assigning the name Kenneth to the storm.

Soon after being named, Kenneth began to rapidly intensify, with the JTWC noting that a formative eye feature had developed. Around 00:00 UTC on 24 April, the MFR upgraded the system to a severe tropical storm. A few hours later, the JTWC followed suit, upgrading Kenneth to the equivalent of a Category 1 hurricane on the Saffir–Simpson hurricane wind scale. At 12:00 UTC, Kenneth was upgraded by the MFR into the record-breaking tenth tropical cyclone of the season. At that time, the MFR stated that an eye was attempting to form within the central dense overcast of the storm, and that wind shear was beginning to decrease. Around 18:00 UTC, Kenneth strengthened into the equivalent of a Category 3 major hurricane. Six hours later, the MFR upgraded Kenneth to intense tropical cyclone status, noting that the storm had a very cold convective ring and that the core had become more compact. At that time, Kenneth had a pinhole eye surrounded by very strong convection; however, the storm also began to undergo an eyewall replacement cycle. As Kenneth approached the Mozambique coastline, the system slowly began to weaken due to the eyewall replacement cycle and the frictional effects of land interaction. This made Kenneth the most intense landfalling tropical cyclone in the recorded history of Mozambique. This also marked the second time in Mozambique's recorded history in which two storms have made landfall during the same cyclone season at intense tropical cyclone intensity or higher.

As the storm drifted further inland, it rapidly degenerated. Shortly afterward, the JTWC issued its last warning on the system. Kenneth's central convection had drastically shrunk, with only a small area remaining over land. Despite still being in a favorable atmospheric environment, Kenneth continued to rapidly weaken due to interaction with land. Kenneth continued to weaken, with its winds falling below gale force as it continued its southward motion. On 27 April, thunderstorms developed off the coast of Mozambique, although the center of Kenneth remained over land, as the system began drifting northward. On 28 April, Kenneth emerged off the coast of northern Mozambique, but continued to weaken due to unfavorable conditions. Subsequently, Kenneth dissipated by 12:00 UTC on 29 April.

Preparations and impact
Overall, Kenneth killed at least 52 people and damage is estimated to be at least US$345 million.

In the country of Comoros, Kenneth's winds and rains killed at least seven people and injured more than 200 others. Preliminary estimates state that approximately 60–80% of staple crops were destroyed. Damage was estimated at CF81.7 billion (US$188 million), equivalent to 16% of the country's GDP.

Kenneth struck Mozambique about a month after Cyclone Idai had devastated the northern part of the country, raising fears that the ongoing humanitarian crisis there could be worsened by the storm. Local authorities in northern Mozambique evacuated more than 30,000 people ahead of the storm, given the expected impacts.

The IFRC reported widespread damage in the city, with power outages recorded throughout the city and numerous trees felled, which caused even more damage. In Mozambique, a total of 45 people were killed, including a woman who was killed by a falling coconut tree near Pemba. Additionally, four ships sank off the coast of the town of Palma. On Ibo Island, it was reported that 90% of the homes were destroyed. In Cabo Delgado Province, 2,500 homes were destroyed with multiple schools and hospitals also sustaining damage.

Aftermath
After the storm, the European Union released €1.5 million (US$1.7 million) as an immediate assistance for those being affected by the cyclone in Mozambique and Comoros. The United Nations provided an emergency aid of $13 million to Mozambique and Comoros, which can help provide food and water, as well as repair the damaged infrastructure. The storm also resulted in a temporary reduction of violence amid the Islamist insurgency in Mozambique, though rebel attacks resumed in May 2019.

See also

 Weather of 2019
 Tropical cyclones in 2019
 Other storms named Kenneth
 Cyclone Fantala
 Cyclone Eloise – Cyclone to hit Beira, Mozambique in Jan 2021
 Cyclone Idai – an intense tropical cyclone that impacted Mozambique earlier in March 2019, causing catastrophic flooding, widespread damage, and extensive loss of life
 Tropical Storm Doloresse – a storm that took a similar path and killed 67 people in Mohéli

References

External links

MFR Track Data of Intense Tropical Cyclone Kenneth 
24S.KENNETH  from the United States Naval Research Laboratory

K
2018–19 South-West Indian Ocean cyclone season
2019 in Mozambique
2019 in Madagascar
2019 in Mayotte
2019 in the Comoros
2019 in Seychelles
Cyclones in the Comoros
Cyclones in Madagascar
Cyclones in Mayotte
Cyclones in Seychelles
Tropical storms
April 2019 events in Africa
Cyclones in Mozambique
Natural disasters in the Comoros
Natural disasters in Mayotte
Natural disasters in Tanzania